João Marques de Jesus Lopes (16 August 1958 – 7 January 2023), known as Djão, was a Portuguese professional footballer who played as a forward.

Djão died on 7 January 2023, at the age of 64.

References

External links 
 
 

1958 births
2023 deaths
People from Tete Province
Mozambican emigrants to Portugal
Portuguese footballers
Mozambican footballers
Association football forwards
Portugal international footballers
Moçambola players
Primeira Liga players
GDR Textáfrica players
G.D. Chaves players
C.F. Os Belenenses players
F.C. Penafiel players
F.C. Marco players
Rebordosa A.C. players